Lützowstraße, a street in Munich
Miernicza Street, Wrocław, Lützowstraße till 1945